The 1966 St. Louis Cardinals season was the 47th season the team was in the National Football League (NFL), and the seventh in St. Louis. The team moved its home games from the old Busch Stadium to the new Busch Stadium in downtown St. Louis, and bettered their 1965 record of 5–9, winning eight games. Despite the improvement, they failed to qualify for the playoffs for the 18th consecutive season.

NFL draft

Roster

Schedule

Game summaries

Week 1

Standings

References

External links
 1966 St. Louis Cardinals at Pro-Football-Reference.com

Arizona Cardinals seasons
St. Louis Cardinals
1966 in sports in Missouri